Wiwilí is a town and a municipality in the Jinotega department of Nicaragua.

References 

Municipalities of the Jinotega Department